Kaoma District with headquarters at Kaoma, Zambia is located in the north-east corner of Western Province.  As of the 2000 Zambian Census, the district had a population of 162,568 people. The population lives mainly around Kaoma town and the northern parts of the district along the Luena and Luampa Rivers. Its south-western portion is relatively uninhabited being very sandy with little water available in the dry season.

References

Districts of Western Province, Zambia